Robert Joseph McAdorey (July 24, 1935 – February 5, 2005) was a Canadian television and radio broadcaster.

McAdorey was born and raised in Niagara Falls, Ontario. During his high school years, Bob McAdorey was the President of Alpha Kappa Chapter of Gamma Sigma Fraternity International at Stamford Collegiate. In the 1960s, McAdorey was one of Canada's most influential radio DJs, as the afternoon 1300-1600 and later drivetime, weekdays 1600-1900 host on 1050 CHUM. "Bob McAdorey, whose face is as well known in Toronto as Mayor Givens, has the most power to dictate what pop music Ontario teens listen to," the Toronto Telegram contended in 1966. When the station moved to a more strictly formatted, less personality-centred sound in 1968, McAdorey left 1050 CHUM, and later worked at CFGM and CFTR.

McAdorey joined the fledgling Global Television Network in Ontario in 1976 on contract producing humorous pieces for Global's newscast and hosted a late-night satirical show, Mac from 1979 to 1980.

From 1980 to 2000, he was an entertainment reporter for Global, appearing both on newscasts and as the host of Entertainment Desk in the 1990s and co-anchor with John Dawe and Mike Anscombe of the station's popular News at Noon for fourteen years. He was once fired from the station for filing a report which station management deemed inappropriately humorous, but was hired back after many of the station's viewers called and wrote letters in protest. (The producer who fired him was fired himself.)

In July 2000 he was retired, against his wishes, from Global due to the station's policy at the time of mandatory retirement at 65. McAdorey returned briefly in 2001 to give movie reviews, but spent most of his final years in Niagara-on-the-Lake, Ontario.

In February 2005, he died in hospital in St. Catharines, Ontario after a prolonged illness.

External links
Obituary (Torstar News Service)
The Bob McAdorey Story (video)

1935 births
2005 deaths
Canadian radio personalities
Canadian people of Irish descent
People from Niagara Falls, Ontario
Canadian television news anchors